Elections to Rochford District Council were held on 5 May 2011 alongside other local elections across the United Kingdom. The Conservative Party remained the largest party.

Thirteen seats were up for election, comprising one third of the council. Three seats were uncontested, with only a Conservative Party candidate. Of the remaining ten, the Conservatives won seven, gaining one from the Liberal Democrats who won two, and losing one to Rochford District Residents.

References

2011 English local elections
2011